Otnice is a municipality and village in Vyškov District in the South Moravian Region of the Czech Republic. It has about 1,600 inhabitants.

Etymology
The name Otnice is derived from the personal name Oten.

Geography
It lies in an agricultural landscape, which mostly belongs to the Ždánice Forest. The northwestern part of the municipal territory extends into the Dyje–Svratka Valley. The municipality is situated at the confluence of two small brooks, Otnický and Bošovický.

History
The first written mention of Otnice is from 1255.

Economy
The municipality is mainly focused on agriculture.

Sights
The main sight is the parish Church of Saint Aloysius. The current Neo-Renaissance structure was built in 1855–1856.

References

External links

Cezava Microregion
Ždánický les a Politaví Microregion

Villages in Vyškov District